Charles Binamé  (born May 25, 1949) is a Quebec director. He was born in Belgium and came to Montreal with his family at a young age. He joined the National Film Board of Canada as an assistant director in 1971, but soon left for the private sector. During the 1970s, he mostly directed documentaries for Quebec television, and in the 1980s he directed over 200 television commercials, including some in England. When he returned to Canada in the early 1990s, he directed two of Quebec's most popular television series of all time, Blanche (the sequel to the series Les Filles de Caleb) and Marguerite Volant. The former won him seven Prix Gémeaux and the FIPA d'Or at Cannes Film Festival for best drama series. Also in the 1990s Binamé wrote and directed a trio of edgy urban dramas – Eldorado, Streetheart (Le Coeur au poing) and Pandora's Beauty (La Beauté de Pandore). His big-budget Séraphin: Heart of Stone (a remake of Un Homme et son péché) was a huge box-office hit in Quebec in 2002, and in 2005 he directed The Rocket, a biography of hockey legend Maurice Richard, which earned him a Genie Award for best director.

Television 
Blanche (1993 series)
Marguerite Volant (1996 mini-series)
 (2004)
H2O (2004 mini-series)
The Trojan Horse (2008 mini-series, sequel to H2O)
Durham County (2010, three episodes)
Reign (TV series)

Filmography 
Un autre homme - 1990
Chili's Blues (C'était le 12 du 12, et Chili avait les blues) - 1994
Eldorado - 1995
Streetheart (Le Coeur au poing) - 1998
Pandora's Beauty (La Beauté de Pandore) - 2000
Séraphin: Heart of Stone (Séraphin: Un homme et son péché) - 2002
The Rocket (Maurice Richard) - 2005
The American Trap (Le piège américain) - 2008
Cyberbully - 2011
Elephant Song - 2014

Awards and recognition
 2007: Genie Award for Best Direction,
 2020: Knight, National Order of Quebec

References

External links 

Charles Binamé Official Agency Listing and CV (In French)

Living people
1949 births
Belgian expatriates in Canada
Best Director Genie and Canadian Screen Award winners
Film directors from Montreal
Canadian television directors
National Film Board of Canada people